The Flame is the fifth album by Spanish rock band Dover, released on 27 October 2003. Recorded in PKO Studios in Madrid with producer Rick Will and mastered by Stephen Marcussen (Marcussen Mastering, New York City). The album has sold 60,000 copies in Spain and approximately 50,000 copies in Germany. On 5 June 2004, the band played the music festival Rock am Ring in support of the album.

Reception 
In 2005, The Flame was ranked number 484 in Rock Hard magazine's book of The 500 Greatest Rock & Metal Albums of All Time.

Track listing 
Lyrics and music by Amparo Llanos and Cristina Llanos.

Charts

Certifications

Release history

References

External links 
 

Dover (band) albums
2003 albums